Woodhaven used to be a small village between Newport-on-Tay and Wormit in Fife, Scotland. Due to expansion of these two villages over the years, it is now just the name for a harbour and pier (Grid Reference NO407270).
During World War II there was a flying boat station at Woodhaven operating four PBY5 Catalina aircraft manned by Flight A of No. 333 (Norwegian) Squadron, Royal Air Force. The Norwegian personnel were based at RAF Leuchars along with their colleagues in Flight B who flew land based Mosquito aircraft.

The ship  was moored off Woodhaven for several years, serving as a training ship.

A commemorative stone at the Woodhaven harbour reads:

Next to the pier there has been The Old Boathouse bed & breakfast.

References

Sources 
 http://www.british-history.ac.uk/report.asp?compid=16176

Villages in Fife
Newport-on-Tay